

Rudolf Buhse (10 April 1905  – 26 November 1997) was an officer in the Wehrmacht of Nazi Germany during World War II and a Brigadegeneral in Bundeswehr.  He was a recipient of the Knight's Cross of the Iron Cross. Buhse surrendered to the Allied troops during the fall of Tunisia in 1943.

Post-war 
Buhse was released in 1946, he joined the West German Bundeswehr on 1 September 1956 (rank Oberst). He headed the commission for the admission of former Wehrmacht soldiers into the Bundeswehr in Hannover and later worked in the Federal Ministry of Defence in Bonn. From 1 July 1959 to 31 October 1960 he commanded the Panzergrenadierbrigade 2 in Braunschweig and became commander of the Infantry school in Hammelburg on 1 November 1960 (promoted to Brigadegeneral in December 1960). Buhse retired on 30 September 1962.

Awards and decorations

 Knight's Cross of the Iron Cross on 17 August 1942 as Oberstleutnant and commander of Infanterie-Regiment 47 
 Grand Merit Cross of the Federal Republic of Germany (Bundesverdienstkreuz) (13 September 1962)

References

Citations

Bibliography

 

1905 births
1997 deaths
People from West Prussia
People from Grudziądz
Bundeswehr generals
Recipients of the Gold German Cross
Recipients of the Knight's Cross of the Iron Cross
Commanders Crosses of the Order of Merit of the Federal Republic of Germany
German prisoners of war in World War II held by the United States
Brigadier generals of the German Army